Fever Dream is the third solo studio album by English singer, songwriter, author, and multi-instrumentalist Ben Watt. It was released on 8 April 2016 on Unmade Road. Self-produced at RAK Studios in London, it continues his relationship with guitarist Bernard Butler, begun on his award-winning 2014 album Hendra, and adds guest cameos from MC Taylor of North Carolina folk-rock band Hiss Golden Messenger, and Boston singer-songwriter Marissa Nadler. It received a 9/10 review in Uncut magazine. In a four-star review, the Guardian said: 'In his early 50s, he is making some of the best music of his career.'

Track listing

Personnel
Ben Watt - vocals, electric and acoustic guitars, piano, synthesizer
Bernard Butler - electric guitar
Martin Ditcham - drums, percussion
Rex Horan - bass
Marissa Nadler - backing vocals on "New Year of Grace"
M.C. Taylor - backing vocals on "Fever Dream"

Charts

References

2016 albums
Ben Watt albums